Hunter the White Wolf is a fictional character appearing in American comic books published by Marvel Comics.

Publication history
The character, created by Christopher Priest and Mark Texeira, first appeared in Black Panther vol. 3 #4 (February 1999).

Fictional character biography
After his parents' death in a plane crash in Wakanda, Hunter was adopted by King T'Chaka. Being a white foreigner, Hunter was viewed with suspicion and even contempt by the cautious Wakandans. Despite this, he developed a true love for Wakanda as one of his adopted homeland's staunchest patriots. Hunter knew he would never ascend to the throne with T'Challa as the true heir and, feeling cheated, developed a deep jealousy for T'Challa. He drove himself to be the best Wakandan possible in an attempt to upstage his adopted brother. It was this fervor that led to the previous Black Panther appointing Hunter as leader of the Hatut Zeraze (the secret police of Wakanda) where he became known as the White Wolf.

When the current Black Panther disbanded the Hatut Zeraze due to their brutality, White Wolf and his loyal subordinates left Wakanda to work as mercenaries. Though resentful of this situation, White Wolf still harbored a love for his adopted home country, and thus tempered his resentment of Black Panther to aid their country when needed, serving as an ally of sorts to Kasper Cole, a temporary Black Panther.

Hunter became displeased that T'Challa abdicated the throne of Wakanda in order to protect Hell's Kitchen, Manhattan (T'Challa's goal was to test himself after recent losses and Matt Murdock needed time to heal after recent events). In retaliation, he killed some people in order to take the Black Panther mantle from T'Challa. When Black Panther defeated White Wolf, he was told that Wakanda has no place for murderers.

During the "Empyre" storyline, White Wolf and the Hatut Zeraze appeared among the Wakandans that fought the Cotati. They were seen to the south of Khartoum, fighting the Cotati archers who attacked that location.

Powers and abilities
White Wolf is an expert at hand-to-hand combat.

Equipment
Alongside the Hatut Zeraze, White Wolf wielded a Vibranium Microweave Mesh that stops bullets in mid-flight and is immune to slashes, special cloaking technology that can double as a business suit, boots with energy-dampening abilities, and an assortment of handguns and other weapons.

Reception
 In 2018, Comicbook.com ranked White Wolf 5th in their "8 Best Black Panther Villains" list.
 In 2020, CBR.com ranked White Wolf 3rd in their "Marvel: Ranking Black Panther's Rogues Gallery" list.
 In 2022, Screen Rant included White Wolf in their "15 Most Powerful Black Panther Villains" list, and in their "10 Best Black Panther Comics Characters Not In The MCU" list.
 In 2022, CBR.com ranked White Wolf 6th in their "10 Most Iconic Black Panther Villains" list.

In other media
 The White Wolf appears in Avengers Assemble, voiced by Scott Porter. This version is the adopted brother of T'Challa and Shuri, and a former student of N'Jadaka. Introduced in the episode "The Panther and the Wolf", White Wolf is approached by N'Jadaka to defect from Wakanda. However, the former obtains a list of the Shadow Council's operatives and joins forces with his foster siblings to fight M'Baku. In "The Good Son", White Wolf tries to steal a powerful Wakandan artifact and hide it due to T'Challa working with Captain America and Helmut Zemo, but is stopped and imprisoned. In the two-part episode "King Breaker", White Wolf is released to help T'Challa stop the Shadow Council from starting a war with Atlantis using Iron Man's technology. In "Atlantis Attacks", White Wolf rescues T'Challa from Bask's execution by using Ulysses Klaue as a hostage. In retaliation for Madame Masque's technology attacking Atlantis for Bask, Lady Elanna and Tiger Shark go after T'Challa and White Wolf. Though Shuri manages to convince them of Bask's self-sacrifice and T'Challa makes peace with Lady Elanna, Tiger Shark kills White Wolf, causing T'Challa to viciously attack the former and nearly repay him in kind before relenting to honor White Wolf's memory.
 The White Wolf appears as a playable character in Lego Marvel's Avengers.

References

External links
 White Wolf at Marvel Wiki

Characters created by Christopher Priest
Fictional adoptees
Fictional mercenaries
Marvel Comics characters